Helen Swift Neilson (1869 – 18 June 1945) was an American writer and art collector.

Biography
Neilson was the daughter of Annie Maria (née Higgins) and Gustavus Franklin Swift, founder of the meatpacking company Swift & Co. Her first husband was Edward Morris, son of Nelson Morris, the founder of Morris & Company, a competitor to her father. They had 4 children: Edward Morris, Jr., Nelson Swift Morris, Ruth Morris Bakwin, and Muriel Morris Gardiner Buttinger. In 1913, her husband died and in 1917, she remarried to British politician and writer Francis Neilson, with whom she founded the weekly paper The Freeman in 1920.

She is perhaps best known for her book about her parents called My Father and My Mother.

Neilson died in Chicago. She bequeathed several notable paintings to the Metropolitan Museum of Art:

References

1869 births
1945 deaths
People from Barnstable, Massachusetts
American women writers
American art collectors
People associated with the Metropolitan Museum of Art
Wellesley College alumni
Morris family (meatpacking)